Edouard Gregory Hesselberg (3 May 1870 – 12 June 1935) was a pianist and composer.

Early life and family
Hesselberg was born in Riga, Russian empire (now Latvia), the son of Sarah (Davidoff) and Heinrich Hesselberg. His family was Jewish. When he was three years old, the family moved to Oryol, where he studied at a classical gymnasium (1878-1886).

He was the father of actors Melvyn Douglas and George Douglas. The tradition of arts reaches to his great-granddaughter Illeana Douglas (granddaughter of Melvyn Douglas).

Training
Hesselberg did some of his training at the Moscow Philharmonic Society. He also studied with Anton Rubinstein.  Hesselberg lived in France and Germany before he moved to the USA in 1892.

Career
Hesselberg composed more than 100 piano pieces and songs during his career. He also wrote A review of music in Canada for a 1913 addition to a set of volumes called, Modern Music and Musicians (New York, Toronto 1912.) That particular work of his remains a valued source for that period.

He died 12 June 1935 in Los Angeles, California, US., at age 65.

References

External links
 Sheet music in Nebraska Memories

1870 births
1935 deaths
People from Riga
People from Kreis Riga
Latvian Jews
Emigrants from the Russian Empire to the United States
American people of Latvian-Jewish descent
American pianists
Russian composers
Russian male composers
Russian pianists
American male pianists